Xiamen International Bank (XIB) was established in August 1985 as the first joint venture bank in China with capital of RMB 410.069 billion. Xiamen International Bank has now grown into a bank with good reputation in the world that covers Hong Kong, Macao and Mainland China.

Locations

In Mainland China, XIB operates branches and multiple sub-branches in cities including Beijing, Shanghai, Fuzhou, Zhuhai, Xiamen, and a representative office in Quanzhou. After years of development, Xiamen International Bank has been listed as "World Top 1000 Banks" and "Asia Top 200 Banks" by The Banker magazine of the U.K. for many years.

XIB is based in Xiamen, Fujian Province, which also operates subsidiaries including Xiamen International Investment Limited (XIIL) in Hong Kong and Luso International Banking Limited (LIB) which runs 11 branches in Macau.

Shareholders
 Industrial and Commercial Bank of China (18.75%) 
 Fujian Investment and Enterprise Holdings Corporation (12%) 
 Xiamen C&D Corporation Limited (7.5%) 
 Min Xin Holdings Limited (HKSE listed) (36.75%)
 Asian Development Bank (10%) 
 Shinsei Bank Limited (from Japan) (10%) 
 Sino Finance Group Company Limited (from U.S.) (5%)

References

External links
 Xiamen International Bank Official website

Banks of China
Companies based in Xiamen